The Dunhua–Baihe high-speed railway, or Changbaishan–Dunhua section of Shenyang–Jiamusi high-speed railway, is a high-speed railway line in China.

History
Construction on the line began in August 2017. Trial operation began on 29 October 2021. It opened on 24 December 2021.

Route
The line runs from north to south, starting at the existing Dunhua railway station. It has two intermediate stations, Dunhua South and Yongqing. The southern terminus is Changbaishan.

References

High-speed railway lines in China
Railway lines opened in 2021